The Satellite Award for Outstanding New Talent was a special achievement award given by the International Press Academy between 1996 and 2012.

After the retirement of the Outstanding New Talent Award in 2012, a similar award was given as a Breakthrough Performance Award in 2013. In addition, a special achievement Satellite Award was awarded for Best First Feature in 2011, 2016, and 2017.

Winners

Outstanding New Talent

Best First Feature

Breakthrough Performance Award

References

External links
 International Press Academy website

New Talent